Creepy Susie and 13 Other Tragic Tales for Troubled Children is a 1999 collection of illustrated short stories written by Angus Oblong. The stories mostly feature children and adolescents, although one story is about a dog. Several of the characters were eventually adapted for use in the animated television series The Oblongs. Contrary to the title, children are not the book's target audience, as the book contains sexual situations, cannibalism and murder.

List of stories 
"The Debbies"
"Stupid Betsy"
"Waldo & Bean"
"Little Scooter"
"Happy Happy Happy Happy Sammy"
"Milo's Disorder"
"Creepy Susie"
"Emily Amputee"
"Narcoleptic Scottie"
"Sibling Rivalry..."
"Rosie's Crazy Mother"
"Jenny, Jenny, Jenny and Babette, the Siamese Quadruplets"
"Dick and Muffy"
"Mary Had a Little Chainsaw"

The Oblongs
The Oblongs is a television series based on the characters from this book. Milo from the book becomes Milo Oblong, the de facto main character in the TV series; Creepy Susie and Helga both appear as his friends, while the Debbies appear as snobbish enemies. (Helga, in the series, is obsessed with them, though out of a desire to join them rather than hurt them; however, she does at one point join them as in the book.) Scottie the dog becomes Milo's pet.
Many of the other characters do not appear on the show.

References

External links 
 Angus Oblong's books at his personal website
 Excerpt from "The Debbies" at Randomhouse.com

American short story collections
1999 short story collections
Black comedy books
Disability literature
Works by Angus Oblong